Tiselius is a lunar impact crater that lies just to the east of Valier, on the Moon's far side. The craters Tiselius and Valier are separated by only a few kilometers. Less than one crater diameter to the east of Tiselius is the smaller, elongated Stein, and to the north is the small, eroded Šafařík.

This is a roughly circular crater with a well-defined edge that has not been significantly degraded by impact erosion. The inner walls have slumped in places to form piles of scree. The interior floor is marked by a few small craterlets, and there is an irregular group of ridges around the midpoint. The small, cup-shaped satellite crater Tiselius E lies near the eastern outer edge.

The crater was named after Swedish biochemist Arne Tiselius, by the IAU in 1979.

Satellite craters
By convention these features are identified on lunar maps by placing the letter on the side of the crater midpoint that is closest to Tiselius.

References

 
 
 
 
 
 
 
 
 
 
 
 

Impact craters on the Moon